A by-election to the French National Assembly was held in Upper Volta on 27 June 1948, alongside Territorial Assembly elections. The election was held following the separation of the territory of Upper Volta from Ivory Coast, which created a new constituency. The Voltaic Union won all three seats, which were taken by Henri Guissou, Mamadou Ouédraogo and Nazi Boni.

Results

References

Upper Volta
1948 in French Upper Volta
Elections in Burkina Faso
By-elections to the National Assembly (France)